The Bury–Holcombe Brook line was a  single-track railway line which ran between Bury Bolton Street railway station and Holcombe Brook railway station via seven intermediate stations, Woodhill Road Halt, Brandlesholme Road Halt, Woolfold, Sunny Wood Halt, Tottington, Knowles Halt, and Greenmount.

History

Opened in 1882 by the Bury and Tottington District Railway the line was taken over by the Lancashire and Yorkshire Railway in 1888. Initially the line had stations at Woolfold, Greenmount, Tottington and Holcombe Brook with additional halts opening at Woodhill Road, Brandlesholme Road, Sunnywood and Knowles Crossing in 1905.

Passenger services operated until 1952, while freight services continued to Holcombe Brook until 1960 and Tottington until 1963.

Electrification
In 1912 Dick, Kerr & Co.‘s  Preston factory were considering tendering for a Brazilian contract and approached the Lancashire and Yorkshire Railway to use the branch for test purposes at Dick, Kerr's expense. The line from Bury Bolton Street Station to Holcombe Brook was electrified with the overhead 3.5 kV dc system, rolling stock was also supplied at their cost. After prolonged trials the trains entered public use on 29 July 1913. The L&Y purchased the equipment and stock on the successful completion of the trials in 1916. During 1917 work started on the branch to convert to third rail to match the Manchester to Bury system. The third rail trains started to run on 29 March 1918.

Kirklees Trail

The section of the line from Greenmount to Bury town centre has been converted into a pedestrian and cycle route, the Kirklees Trail, forming part of National Cycle Route 6.

See also
 LYR electric units

References
Signal Boxes on Lancashire and Yorkshire Railway Lines: North and West of Manchester: Part Two by Chris Littleworth (Lancashire & Yorkshire Railway Society,) 
Lost Railways of Lancashire by Gordon Suggitt

External links
British Railways in 1960, The Holcombe Brook line

Closed railway lines in North West England
Rail transport in Greater Manchester
Railway lines opened in 1882
Railway lines closed in 1963
Closed railway lines in Greater Manchester
Rail trails in England